Boophis ulftunni is a species of frogs in the family Mantellidae. It is endemic to Madagascar.

References 

ulftunni
Endemic frogs of Madagascar
Amphibians described in 2008